Crangan Bay is a coastal suburb of the Central Coast region of New South Wales, Australia, located between Budgewoi and Swansea on the bay of the same name. It is part of the  local government area.

The suburb is a bushland area currently undergoing urban development. The major land owners are the local aboriginal land council and land held by an urban development company and the Coal and Allied mining company, who intend to turn this area into a suburb.

There is a concrete recycling depot and gravel quarry on the northern end of the suburb which contains conglomerate used for road base. This product has been extensively used by Wyong Shire Council in the construction of local roads.

This bay is part of the greater Wallarah Peninsula and Lower Hunter bioregions.

References

Suburbs of the Central Coast (New South Wales)
Bays of New South Wales